Jyoti is an Indian television series that was aired on Imagine TV, produced by Sphere Origins. It started airing on 16 February 2009, and concluded on 27 November 2010.

The series is based on a real life incident of a person close to the writer Purnendu Shekhar.

Plot

Jyoti tells the story of the eldest daughter of her family — the only person working and sacrificing her own dreams and ambitions to fulfill others.

When she finally finds her Prince Charming, it turns out he has an affair with her younger sister Sushma. When Jyoti is finally getting back up on her feet, fate intrudes again and it turns out that Sushma isn't her real sister.

She falls in love with a rich man and marries him. But fate intrudes for the third time and turns out that her other real sister Sudha has a double personality: She is soft-spoken Sudha at home and party girl Devika at night. Will Jyoti finally get the way she wants? Sudha is helped through this by a psychologist. After this Sudha falls in love with Pankaj’s cousin brother Udai and they secretly marry, resulting in Choti Ma blaming Jyoti for all the problems in the house. However, to add to Jyoti's problems, she finds out that Sushma is having problems living with Brij, he gets drunk and abuses Sushma. This problem is solved by Jyoti returning a pregnant Sushma to her parents' house.

This makes everyone think that Brij is going to keep his distance but he doesn't and he is back. He makes up a new plan to hurt Jyoti by becoming friends with Pankaj. Can Jyoti stop Brij from ruining her marriage or should she tell Pankaj the truth about everything? Soon Sushma and Sundeep make a plan for Sushma to go back to Rahul. Then the police get Rahul arrested. Jyoti tells Pankaj all about her sister Sushma and Brij. This results in Pankaj throwing Jyoti out of the house; little does he know that Jyoti is pregnant. He learns about this later on but still doesn't want anything to do with Jyoti; he files for a divorce with the reason being that he believes that he is not the father to Jyoti's unborn child.Pankaj is still seeing Jyoti but isn't forgiving her. He has said I will say nothing about what has happened if you do, but still he doesn't want to get back with Jyoti. Jyoti and Pankaj don't get divorced. This means that Jyoti and Pankaj will get back together.

Jyoti is now divorced. She meets a man, Kabir, whom she works with. Her family is not happy with their relationship after a few weeks, as her divorce has only happened. They go everywhere, causing chaos to the Sharma family. When Kabir makes it up to the Sharma family, he is allowed to hang around with Jyoti. Kabir meets Brij who now has cancer. Kabir makes Brij straight as he wants Sushma and his baby back. They wed in a big celebration. On the day of the wedding, Kabir proposes to Jyoti — she says a lot of things to him but doesn't say yes. Sushma and Rahul are very happy and hoping that their baby is due soon so that they can live a very happy life. One day after the wedding, Kabir and Jyoti see that someone is about to rob Sannidhya's money and shoot him. Kabir jumps in front of Sannidhya and takes the bullet. He is fine, but Jyoti is now having regrets about saying all those things to Kabir. Jyoti has realised that she loves Kabir and will marry him, much to the chagrin of Sannidhya who wants Jyoti and his child back. Jyoti goes to meet Sannidhya, and she soon finds out that he wants the baby. He says that he isn't going to let her go until she has the baby (so he can take it). Jyoti tries to escape but, as she reaches the stairs, Sannidhya grabs her. Jyoti tries getting away but ends up falling down the stairs. She is badly injured. Sannidhya takes her to a hospital, where the doctor tells him that they can only save one person: the baby or Jyoti.

Kabir and Sandeep go to the police to report that Jyoti is missing. Sannidhya decides the baby should to survive. Luckily for Jyoti, she has an operation and both live. Later, Sandeep and Kabir visit the hospital. They see Jyoti, and the doctor announces that there is bad news. The baby is dead...

Sannidhya told the doctor to say the baby is dead when actually he took the baby. Everyone believes the doctor and Jyoti wishes she had a child. Chuti Ma is angry at Sannidhya and wants him to give the baby back. Finally, Jyoti marries Kabir. Jyoti and Kabir are happily married, but is there something stopping Jyoti from entering her new house? Jyoti now lives in a haweli against her in-laws wish. Actually Kabirs chachisa wants him to get marry to her niece. Now Chachisa plans to get rid of Jyoti with bhapusa and sumer bhaisa.

Jyoti has found out that her friend who is just like a sister to her, Rashmi's baby's father, is none other than Kabir's younger brother Vikrant. Jyoti makes a plan to get them married. After many complications she succeeds, but Vikrant does not accept Rashmi or the baby; he treats them very badly. Chachisa has gone to a professional to get Jyoti killed. When the killer comes for Jyoti, Jyoti misunderstands that he is here to kill Kabir. The killer shoots, Jyoti jumps in front of Kabir, and the bullet hits her. Jyoti ends up in ICU and is very critical. Kabir stays with her the whole night. Jyoti kept on hearing cries from the ward next door. She then goes to see who it was. It was a girl called Roshni, Jyoti's real baby. Jyoti took the baby and rocked her in her arms. The baby eventually stopped crying. Jyoti left the ward when the baby fell asleep. The next day Jyoti was ready to leave the hospital and go home. Jyoti forgot to take her watch so she goes back to the hospital to pick it up. Jyoti also discovers that the baby is not in its ward. She asks the doctor where she is. The doctor says she got really ill so they had to take her to the ice room. Jyoti then takes the baby home to look after because Sannidhya is busy. When Jyoti gives back Roshni she forgot to give Roshni's bag back too. She then turns it round and sees that the baby's name is Roshni Vashisht: her baby. She goes to Sannidhya's house and asks for Roshni back. Sannidhya refuses and asks "Who do you want more Roshni or Kabir?"

Sannidhya tells Jyoti to either have another baby with him or have a test tube baby. She consults her mother who tells her to choose her husband Kabir and never to take any step like that. Jyoti saves Roshni and she gets pregnant with Sannidhya's child. Kabir accepts what she said and is with her. Nine months later Kabir and Jyoti meet some people who wanted to kill Kabir; suddenly Sannidhya arrives and saves him. They shoot and kill Sannidhya. Jyoti and Kabir go to the hospital. She gives birth to a boy and Roshni's life got saved. When they reach, home Chachi sa has a gun and is about to shoot Jyoti when Chachi sa's son Vikrant shoots Chachi sa, and she dies. After some years, the kids grow up. It is Jyoti's birthday. The kids and the family have a big party at home. Roshni then wants to know Jyoti's whole life story and she tells her.

Cast

 Sneha Wagh as Jyoti Sharma, Jyoti Pankaj Vashisht and Jyoti Kabir Sisodia : Roshani and sanidhya"Jeet"'s mother and Kabir's wife  
 Aamir Dalvi as Kabir Sisodia: Roshani and sanidhya"Jeet"'s father and Jyoti's Husband  
 Pallavi Purohit as Asha Sisodia 
 Sriti Jha as Sudha (Devika) Sharma and Sudha Uday Vashisht
 Srinidhi Shetty as Sushma Sharma and Sushma Brijbhushan Shastri
 Sameer Sharma as Rahul Galgotia
 Varun Khandelwal as Tanishq "Sandeep"Sharma 
 Via Roy Choudhury as Panchi
 Divyaalakshmi as Meenal Vashisht Rathore
 Geetu Bawa as Poonam Sharma 
 Zahida Parveen as Padma Kamalkishore Sharma, Jyoti's stepmother
 Sanjay Batra as Kamalkishore Sharma, Jyoti's father
 Sarwar Ahuja as Pankaj Vashisht: Roshani and sanidhya Jeet 's step father and Jyoti's-ek-Husband 
 Alka Kaushal / Tuhina Vohra as Choti Maa
 Alok Narula as Uday Vashisht
 Baby as Roshani sisodia: Kabir and Jyoti's daughter 
 Ankit Arora as Vikrant Sisodia 
 Rituraj Singh as Mr. Sisodia (Mayor Sahab), Kabir's father: Roshani's grandfather 
 Karmveer Choudhary as Roy Sahab
 Aalika Sheikh as Varnika
 Sonia Singh as Neelam Sannidhya Vashisht
 Shilpa Saklani as Ritu

Harsh Vashisht as Raghuveer Sisodiya, Kabir's elder brother
Vimarsh Roshan as Sumer Sisodiya, Kabir's eldest brother

Production
Speaking about the series writer Purnendu Shekhar said: "Jyoti is inspired by a person who was very close to me. She used to tie rakhi to me. So she was like my sister. Her story was waiting to be told, and it was easier to keep the story real as the twists and turns did take place in her life. Most scenes and also dialogues have actually taken place."

The channel had a tie up with Bell Bhajao Campaign reaching out about 124 million people for promoting the series in October 2009.

References

External links 

 Jyoti on Dangal Play 

Indian television soap operas
Imagine TV original programming
2009 Indian television series debuts
2010 Indian television series endings